Tucheng Station can refer to:
Tucheng metro station, a metro station in New Taipei, Taiwan
Tucheng station (Tianjin Metro), a metro station in Tianjin, China

See also
Beitucheng station, a metro station in Beijing, China
Xitucheng station, a metro station in Beijing, China